Robert A. Williams Jr. is an American lawyer, author, and legal scholar. He works in the fields of federal Indian law, international law, indigenous peoples' rights, critical race and post-colonial theory. Williams teaches at the University of Arizona's James E. Rogers College of Law, serving as Regents Professor, E. Thomas Sullivan Professor of Law  and Faculty Chair  of the Indigenous Peoples Law and Policy Program.

Family
Williams is the son of Robert Anthony Williams Sr. and Sallie Williams. He has a wife and two children, Sam and Marley. He has a sister named Karen Amanda Cooper (née Williams) who has four children: Zac, Andrew, K.C., and Ben Cooper.

Early life and education
Williams is an enrolled member of the Lumbee Indian Tribe of North Carolina. He earned his B.A. from Loyola College in Maryland in 1977 and his J.D. from Harvard Law School in 1980.

Career
Now at University of Arizona James E. Rogers College of Law, Williams has established a notable career in the fields of American Indian and International law, indigenous people's rights, and critical race and colonial theory.  He has published several books on these topics.

For the 2003-2004 academic year, Williams was named the first Oneida Indian Nation Visiting Professor of Law at Harvard Law School.  He previously taught there as the Bennet Boskey Distinguished Visiting Lecturer of Law.

Williams served as Chief Justice for the Court of Appeals, Pascua Yaqui Indian Reservation.  He also served as Justice for the Court of Appeals and trial judge pro tem for the Tohono O'odham Nation.

Williams has represented tribal groups before the Inter-American Court of Human Rights, the Inter-American Commission on Human Rights, and the United Nations Working Group on Indigenous Peoples. He served as co-counsel for Floyd Hicks in the United States Supreme Court case, Nevada v. Hicks .

Awards and honors
Williams has received awards from the John D. and Catherine T. MacArthur Foundation, the Soros Foundation Open Society Institute, the National Endowment for the Humanities, the American Council of Learned Societies, and the National Institute of Justice in recognition of his research and advocacy on behalf of Indian tribes and indigenous peoples.

1990 Annual Gustavus Meyers Human Rights Center Award, for outstanding book on the subject of prejudice in the United States - The American Indian in Western Legal Thought: The Discourses of Conquest)

Selected works

References

External links
Indigenous Peoples Law and Policy Program
ArizonaNativeNet
Video of talk by Rob Williams at Simon Fraser University

Year of birth missing (living people)
Living people
21st-century American historians
21st-century American male writers
Harvard Law School alumni
University of Arizona faculty
American male non-fiction writers